Giacomo Serra (1570–1623) was a Catholic cardinal.

Life
He was a son of the noblewoman Claudia Lomellini and her husband Antonio Maria Serra, deputy to Genoa's Nobile Vecchio Portico and a senator of Florence. He moved to Rome, where in January 1601 he was made a clerk to the Apostolic Camera. He was acting governor of Borgo while that post was vacant in 1605 and three years later was made nuncio extraordinary to the papal troops in Hungary. At the end of the latter role he became treasurer general to the Apostolic Camera. In 1606-1608 he commissioned an altarpiece for Santa Maria in Vallicella from Rubens.

On 17 August 1611 Pope Paul V made him a cardinal, granting him the 'diaconi' of San Giorgio in Velabro on 12 September that year. He then became papal legate to Ferrara in 16 September 1615, holding that post until his death and becoming a frequent patron to the painter Guercino. In the meantime he became a cardinal priest on 28 September 1615 with the titulus of Santa Maria della Pace, where he was later buried. He took part in the papal conclaves of 1621 and 1623.

References

1570 births
1623 deaths
17th-century Italian cardinals
Clergy from Genoa